Montreuil-le-Henri is a commune in the Sarthe department in the region of Pays de la Loire in north-western France.

Historically, it was part of the province of Maine, in the area of Haut-Maine.

It had 304 inhabitants in 2019.

The parish church is dedicated to Saint Anne. The Château de Montreuil-le-Henri is a Gothic building in the centre of the village, dating back to the 11th century.

See also
Communes of the Sarthe department

References

Communes of Sarthe